Vrbno nad Lesy is a municipality and village in Louny District in the Ústí nad Labem Region of the Czech Republic. It has about 200 inhabitants.

History
The first written mention of Vrbno nad Lesy is from 1143, when it was donated by Duke Vladislaus II to the Strahov Monastery.

Sights
The landmark of the village is the Church of the Assumption of the Virgin Mary. It was built at the end of the 13th century.

Notable people
Václav Kozák (1937–2004), rower, Olympic winner

References

External links

Villages in Louny District